The Mayo Echo was a controversial, free, weekly tabloid newspaper circulated in County Mayo, Ireland during the 2000s. The paper was first published in 2004 and closed in April 2009.

Circulation
The newspaper claimed to have one of the largest distributions of the 'five county' newspapers, "eventually reaching more than 24,000 copies every week." (from page 2 of the last online edition - edition 221, 15 April 2009). The paper was delivered door-to-door in Ballina, Castlebar, Westport and Claremorris and was also published online every week in PDF format.

Style
The newspaper formed a reputation for tackling controversial subjects using blunt language, and publishing articles criticising what it considered to be examples of corruption or malpractice in local government and other local organisations - in fact, the last online issue had an apology on the front cover relating to an earlier story (dated 30 April 2008) alleging that a local councillor acted improperly when handling planning matters relating to business premises.

As might have been expected, the relationship between the Mayo Echo and the local council (Mayo County Council) was not amicable, and, in the last online edition, editor Tony Geraghty stated that there had been a three-year boycott of the paper by the Council. It is understood that the Mayo Echo was not available in the Mayo County Library and the Council operated an advertising boycott.

A Mayo Echo piece which claimed that hundreds of people would be relocated from troubled housing estates in Limerick to Mayo was described as "off the wall".

Lough Lannagh article, May 2008
In May 2008, the Mayo Echo published an article about alleged gay activity at a local beauty spot in the town of Castlebar. The article sparked hot debate in the local and national press, on national radio and online forums - mainly over its association of the word "pervert" with homosexuality, and the fact that photographs were printed of one person allegedly involved, with their vehicle number plate clearly visible.

Tony Geraghty, editor of the Mayo Echo, objected to some comments about the original article published on the regional bulletin board at http://www.castlebar.ie/. He contacted the website requesting that the comments be removed and that an apology be published. An apology was published and the comments were removed, but new comments appeared, including one allegedly threatening to burn the Mayo Echos offices into the ground. Geraghty then issued a threat of legal action against the website and, as a result, the entire site was removed by the site managers and replaced with a commentary on the events. Geraghty then demanded a list of the names of all the site moderators and contributors, but the site managers refused this request. In quick succession, a campaign website was set up (savecastlebarie.org - no longer online), and groups were formed on Facebook and Myspace. Eventually, Geraghty dropped his threat of legal action and the full website at http://www.castlebar.ie/ returned shortly afterwards.

References

External links
 Mayo Echo — website of the newspaper
 Castlebar.ie web site (shut down as of 3 June 2008, reopen as of April 2009)
 Facebook group relating to the shut down of castlebar.ie
 MySpace group relating to the shut down of castlebar.ie
 RTE (Ireland's national radio broadcaster) podcast covering a broadcast about the controversial article published in the Mayo Echo in May 2008 (MP3) References to Web site shut down at 33:45 and 41:00

2004 establishments in Ireland
2009 disestablishments in Ireland
Castlebar
Defunct newspapers published in Ireland
LGBT history in Ireland
Mass media in County Mayo
Newspapers published in the Republic of Ireland
Newspapers established in 2004
Publications disestablished in 2009
Weekly newspapers published in Ireland